Meghadri Gedda Reservoir is a reservoir in  Visakhapatnam, India. It is one of the main water source for the entire Visakhapatnam city. This reservoir capacity is 11 MGD and maintained by Greater Visakhapatnam Municipal Corporation.

References

Reservoirs in Visakhapatnam
Reservoirs in Andhra Pradesh
Geography of Visakhapatnam
Year of establishment missing